Dušan Vičík (born 18 December 1960) is a Czech rower. He competed in the men's eight event at the 1980 Summer Olympics.

References

1960 births
Living people
Czech male rowers
Olympic rowers of Czechoslovakia
Rowers at the 1980 Summer Olympics
Sportspeople from Olomouc